is a Japanese professional wrestler, best known for his work in All Japan Pro Wrestling. He previously lived in Canada training at the Can-Am Wrestling School under Scott D'Amore, working regularly for the Maximum Pro Wrestling promotion. He is currently signed to Pro Wrestling NOAH.

Professional wrestling career

MUGA (2007)
Soya debuted in MUGA as Osamu Nishimura's pupil, losing to Katsushi Takemura on April 11. Over the next few days however Soya reached a five-minute draw with Yutaka Yoshie, Katsushi Takemura, and Nobuyuki Kurashima to show that he was more than just your average rookie. On July 1 Soya got a match against Tatsumi Fujinami himself, but Fujinami would have little trouble putting him away. In October Soya and Nishimura would leave MUGA for All Japan Pro Wrestling, and Soya would join the other All Japan dojo mates (such as T28 and Seiya Sanada) to help form a very strong group of young wrestlers.

All Japan Pro Wrestling (2007-2014)
Soya teamed with Sanada for much of the year in the mid-card, as they gained valuable experience wrestling against the Voodoo Murders. He did not take part in any of the tournaments, but he showed that perhaps he is the head of his class when he defeated Sanada convincingly at the November Sumo Hall event. In the World's Strongest Tag Determination League he teamed with Sanada, but the pair would come in last place.

After starting the year continuing with his mentor Nishimura, things didn't stay that way as Soya switched over to team with Nishimura's old nemesis Riki Choshu. Starting the year Nishimura and Soya wrestled together in the mid-card, but unlike Sanada he did not take part in the Champion Carnival. After teaming with Nishimura at Sumo Hall and losing to Choshu and Koshinaka, soon thereafter Soya decided he had enough of MUGA and switched to Choshu-ism. After teaming off and on during the fall (whenever Choshu was in All Japan), the pair teamed in the World's Strongest Tag Determination League, and they did very well as they came in 4th place including a big win over All Asia Tag Team Champions Akebono and Ryota Hama. Near the end of the year, Soya left Japan to train under Scott D'Amore at the Can-Am Wrestling School. He also began appearing on Ontario independent shows.

In Canada for the beginning of 2010, Soya has become a regular of the independent circuit in Ontario, most notably Maximum Pro Wrestling. After returning to Japan, Soya teamed up with Seiya Sanada and on August 29, 2010, they defeated the Voodoo Murders (Big Daddy Voodoo and TARU) to win the All Asia Tag Team Championship for the first time. They would lose the title to Daisuke Sekimoto and Yuji Okabayashi on March 21, 2011.

In late 2011 to early 2012 Manabu Soya and All Japan veteran Takao Omori formed the team "GET WILD". On March 20, 2012, Soya and Omori defeated Dark Cuervo and Dark Ozz to win the World Tag Team Championship. After losing the title to Joe Doering and Seiya Sanada on May 20, Soya and Omori regained the title on June 17. They vacated the title on October 30, in time for the 2012 World's Strongest Tag Determination League. They then won Block A  defeating the team of Turmeric Storm (Tomoaki Honma and Kazushi Miyamoto). They got to the finals defeating Last Revolution (Joe Doering and Suwama) to win 2012's World Strongest Tag Determination League and to become the 64th generation World Tag Team Champions. On December 11, Soya unsuccessfully challenged Masakatsu Funaki for the Triple Crown Heavyweight Championship. As a result, Get Wild was forced to disband, despite still holding the World Tag Team Championship. Get Wild went on to lose the title to Burning (Go Shiozaki and Jun Akiyama) on March 17, 2013. Following the loss, Soya was sidelined with a cervical hernia and an oculomotor nerve palsy. Soya underwent eye surgery on May 29 and shoulder surgery on June 12. While still sidelined from in-ring action, Soya held a press conference on December 27, 2013, to announce his resignation from All Japan.

Wrestle-1 (2014-2020)
On January 12, 2014, Soya made his debut for Keiji Mutoh's All Japan splinter promotion Wrestle-1, in an on-screen matchmaker role. Soya was portrayed as a biased authority figure, favoring former tag team partner Seiya Sanada. On February 15, Soya made a surprise in-ring return for a twenty-man battle royal, helping Sanada win the match to become the number one contender to the TNA X Division Championship. Soya wrestled his official return match at a Wrestle-1 event on February 21, losing to Masayuki Kono. On May 4, Soya was defeated by Kai in a grudge match and, as a result, lost his job as the matchmaker of Wrestle-1. On August 8, Wrestle-1 announced Soya had signed with the promotion, ending his days as a freelancer. On September 22, Soya entered the Wrestle-1 Championship tournament, but was defeated in his first round match by Kai. In mid-2014, Soya entered a storyline, where he began accusing Akira of being a spy for the villainous Desperado stable. However, on November 1, after it had been revealed that Soya had been wrong and Tajiri had been the spy, Soya and Akira formed a new version of Get Wild, later named "new Wild order". Later that same month, new Wild order took part in the First Tag League Greatest tournament, set to determine the inaugural Wrestle-1 Tag Team Champions, where they finished second in their block with a record of two wins, one draw and one loss, advancing to the semifinals. On November 30, new Wild order defeated Masayuki Kono and Tajiri to advance to the finals of the tournament, where, later that same day, they were defeated by Kaz Hayashi and Shuji Kondo. Following the tournament, Wrestle-1 quickly set up a rematch between the two finalist teams, but Soya and Akira were again defeated in the title rematch on December 7. On January 30, 2015, Soya received his first shot at the Wrestle-1 Championship, but was defeated by the defending champion, Keiji Mutoh. On April 1, new Wild order received another shot at the Wrestle-1 Tag Team Championship, but were for the third time defeated by Hayashi and Kondo. Following the loss, Soya and Akira announced they were looking for new members to join new Wild order. This led to an evaluation match on June 18, after which Jun Kasai and rookie Kumagoro were accepted as the third and fourth members of new Wild order, turning it from a tag team into a stable. On July 12, Soya and Kasai defeated Hayashi and Kondo to win the Wrestle-1 Tag Team Championship. On August 30, Soya defeated Shuji Kondo in the finals to win the 2015 Wrestle-1 Grand Prix. On September 21, Soya defeated Kai to win the Wrestle-1 Championship. On November 27, Soya and Kasai lost the Wrestle-1 Tag Team Championship to Masayuki Kono and Shuji Kondo. On January 10, 2016, Soya lost the Wrestle-1 Championship to Yuji Hino. On July 1, Soya won his second Wrestle-1 Grand Prix in a row, defeating Hino in the finals. On July 29, Soya and Kasai won the Wrestle-1 Tag Team Championship for the second time. After Soya had been sidelined with a shoulder injury, he and Kasai were stripped of the title on August 20. On December 18, the reunited Get Wild defeated Jake Lee and Kento Miyahara in the finals to win All Japan's 2016 World's Strongest Tag Determination League.

Personal life
Soya's younger brother Takumi is a former professional wrestler, having worked for All Japan from January 2011 to May 2012.

Championships and accomplishments
All Japan Pro Wrestling
All Asia Tag Team Championship (2 times) - with Seiya Sanada
World Tag Team Championship (3 times) - with Takao Omori
World's Strongest Tag Determination League (2012, 2016) - with Takao Omori
F-1 Tag Team Championship (1 time) – with RG1
January 2 New Year's Heavyweight Battle Royal (2012)
Big Japan Pro Wrestling
BJW World Strong Heavyweight Championship (1 time)
Nikkan Sports
Best Tag Team Award (2012) with Takao Omori
Pro Wrestling Illustrated
Ranked No. 139 of the top 500 wrestlers in the PWI 500 in 2013
Tokyo Sports
Best Tag Team Award (2012) – with Takao Omori
Wrestle-1
UWA World Trios Championship (2 times) – with Kaz Hayashi and Shuji Kondo (1), and Ganseki Tanaka and Nosawa Rongai (1)
Wrestle-1 Championship (2 times)
Wrestle-1 Tag Team Championship (3 times) – with Jun Kasai (2) and Akira (1)
Wrestle-1 Grand Prix (2015, 2016)

1Championship not officially recognized by All Japan Pro Wrestling.

References

External links 
All Japan Pro Wrestling profile
Wrestle-1 profile
Manabu Soya official blog

1984 births
Living people
Japanese male professional wrestlers
Sportspeople from Nagano Prefecture
All Asia Tag Team Champions
Wrestle-1 Champions
21st-century professional wrestlers
Wrestle-1 Tag Team Champions
F-1 Tag Team Champions
BJW World Strong Heavyweight Champions